Sandys Parish ( "sands") is one of the nine parishes of Bermuda. It is named for English aristocrat Sir Edwin Sandys (1561–1629), and hence there is no apostrophe in the name.

It is located in the south west of the island chain, occupying the three islands of Ireland Island, Boaz Island, and the larger Somerset Island, as well as a small part of the main island of Bermuda. These islands make up the western coast of the Great Sound, the large expanse of water which dominates the geography of western Bermuda, where it is joined to Southampton parish. Like most other parishes in Bermuda, it covers 2.3 square miles (about 6.0 km2 or 1500 acres). It had a population of 6,983 in 2016.

Natural features in Sandys include Ely's Harbor, the Cathedral Rocks, Daniel's Head, and Mangrove Bay.

Other notable features of Sandys include the Somerset Bridge, which links the mainland to Somerset Island, and the old Royal Naval Dockyard on Ireland Island.

Education
Schools in the Parish:
 Lagoon Park Preschool
 Somerset Primary School
 West End Primary School
 Sandys Middle School

Notable people 

 Kim Wilson, Minister for Health

References

External links
 Bermuda Attractions

 
Parishes of Bermuda